Ian Marlow (born 18 January 1963) is an English-born former rugby union and professional rugby league footballer who played in the 1990s.

Marlow was spotted by Hull F.C. playing rugby union for a local side in Beverley RUFC. He was a strong, no-nonsense forward with a good passing game. As of 2007, he is a civil servant in West Yorkshire, England.

Background
Ian Marlow was born in Beverley, East Riding of Yorkshire, England.

Playing career

International honours
Ian Marlow won caps for Wales while at Wakefield Trinity in 1993 against New Zealand, and in 1994 against France (interchange/substitute), and Australia.

Premiership Final appearances
Ian Marlow played in Hull FC's 14-4 victory over Widnes in the Premiership Final during the 1990–91 season at Old Trafford, Manchester on Sunday 12 May 1991.

References

External links
 (archived by web.archive.org) Stats – PastPlayers – M at hullfc.com
 (archived by web.archive.org) Statistics at hullfc.com

1963 births
Living people
English people of Welsh descent
English rugby league players
Footballers who switched code
Hull F.C. players
Rugby league players from Yorkshire
Rugby league props
Rugby league second-rows
Rugby union players from Beverley
Wakefield Trinity players
Wales national rugby league team players